William Henderson Cate (November 11, 1839 – August 23, 1899) was an American politician, a judge, and a U.S. Representative from Arkansas.

Biography
Cate was born near Murfreesboro, Tennessee, the son of Noah Cate, who was a Baptist minister, and his wife Margaret M. (Henderson) Cate. He attended the common schools, as well as an academy at Abingdon, Virginia.  He ultimately graduated from the University of Tennessee at Knoxville in 1857.  In 1868, he married Virginia E. Warner of Craighead County, and the couple had one son.

Career
Cate taught school while studying law until the Civil War. He served in the Confederate States Army where he rose to the rank of captain.

After a move to Jonesboro, Arkansas in 1865, Cate studied law, and was admitted to the bar in Arkansas in 1866 and commenced the practice of law.  He served as a member of the Arkansas House of Representatives 1871-1873 and during the extra session of 1874.  He was elected prosecuting attorney in 1878, and was later appointed and subsequently elected judge of the second judicial circuit of Arkansas in 1884.  He organized the Bank of Jonesboro in 1887.

Cate presented credentials as a Democratic member-elect to the Fifty-first Congress where he served from March 4, 1889 until March 5, 1890 when he was succeeded by Lewis P. Featherstone.  Featherstone had contested the election after having been put up as a candidate to oppose Cate by The Agricultural Wheel. In an agreement between The Wheel and the Republican Party, the Republicans agreed to support Featherstone against Cate. In return "The Wheel" agreed to support John M. Clayton against Clifton R. Breckinridge. The House Committee on Elections decided in favor of Featherstone, ruling that he won by 86 votes.

Cate was elected to the Fifty-second Congress which ran from March 4, 1891 until March 3, 1893.   He declined to be a candidate for renomination in 1892 to the Fifty-third Congress.  He later resumed the practice of law in Jonesboro, Arkansas.

Death
While on a visit in Toledo, Ohio, Cate died of cancer on August 23, 1899 (age 59 years, 285 days).  He is interred at the City Cemetery in Jonesboro, Arkansas.

References

External links

1839 births
1899 deaths
Politicians from Abingdon, Virginia
Confederate States Army officers
Democratic Party members of the United States House of Representatives from Arkansas
19th-century American politicians